Hebei University of Architecture (Chinese: 河北建筑工程学院, Pingyin: Héběi jiànzhù gōngchéngxué yuàn), formerly Hebei Institute of Architecture and Civil Engineering, is a university in Zhangjiakou Hebei, China under the provincial government.

Hebei Institute of Architecture and Civil Engineering was founded in August 1950 and was initially named Zhang Jiakou Technical School.  In 1951 it was renamed as the Chahar Industrial Institute, and in December 1952 changed its name again to the North China Industrial Institute, under the leadership of the North China Administrative Committee. In May 1954, it became the Zhang Jiakou Architecture and Engineering School attached to the Central People's Government Construction Engineering Department. In June 1958, it was incorporated into Hebei province and changed names successively as the Zhang Jiakou Engineering Institute, Zhang Jiakou Engineering Training School, and Zhang Jiakou Architecture and Engineering School. It was approved by the State Council to be upgraded to an institution of higher learning in 1978 as Hebei Institute of Architecture and Civil Engineering. It is the only higher education institute providing instruction in both architecture and engineering in Hebei province.

In the first decade of the 21st century its name was changed to Hebei University of Architecture.

External links 
Hebei Institute of Architecture and Civil Engineering (Chinese language)

Universities and colleges in Hebei